Bogny is part of the name of several communes in the Ardennes département of northern France:

Bogny-sur-Meuse
Logny-Bogny
Murtin-et-Bogny